Justin David Wei Hung Lee (born January 15, 1990) is an American-Guamanian football player who plays as a midfielder and defender.

College career
Lee was a four-year starter at Penn State University, making 85 appearances and scoring two goals.

International career
Despite being born in Maryland in the United States, Lee chose to represent Guam at international level, as he is eligible through his grandmother. He made his senior debut in a 0–1 defeat by Hong Kong in 2015. He scored his first goal in a 3–2 friendly defeat by Taiwan.

Personal life
Lee has two brothers; a twin, Alex and a younger brother, Nate, who have both also represented Guam at international level. All three made their debut in the same game against Hong Kong.

International statistics

International goals
Scores and results list Guam's goal tally first.

References

External links
 

1990 births
Living people
American soccer players
Association football defenders
Guam international footballers
Guamanian footballers
Penn State Nittany Lions men's soccer players
Soccer players from Maryland
Sportspeople from Rockville, Maryland
American twins
Twin sportspeople